The Southern California Fair is an annual fair held at the Lake Perris Fairgrounds in Perris, California, United States. The event features amusement rides, food concessions, competitive exhibits, carnival games, motorized events, live performances and more. The fair started in 1913 as the Riverside County Fair and has been held at its current location since 1987.

The Perris Auto Speedway is a racetrack that opened in 1996.

No fair was held in 1917, 1942–44 nor  2020.

References

External links 

 Image of "Sweetheart Contest" contestants at the Southern California Fair, Riverside, 1929, Los Angeles Times Photographic Archive (Collection 1429). UCLA Library Special Collections, Charles E. Young Research Library, University of California, Los Angeles.

Fairs in California
Annual fairs
Annual events in Riverside County, California
Perris, California
1913 establishments in California
Festivals established in 1913
Recurring events established in 1913